Brian O'Grady (born 1999) is an Irish hurler who plays for Limerick Championship club Kilteely-Dromkeen and at inter-county level with the Limerick senior hurling team. He usually lines out as a centre-forward.

Career statistics

Honours

Limerick
All-Ireland Senior Hurling Championship (1): 2020
Munster Senior Hurling Championship (1): 2020
National Hurling League (1): 2020
Munster Senior Hurling League (1): 2020

References

1999 births
Living people
Kilteely-Dromkeen hurlers
Limerick inter-county hurlers